The Cisleithanian legislative election, 1907 was held in 1907 in the Margraviate of Istria by universal male suffrage.

Results

Elected lists and candidates 

Elections in Croatia
1907 elections in Europe
1907 in Croatia
Elections in Austria-Hungary
History of Istria